Velim may refer to:

Velim, Goa, a village in India
Interim velim a sole mihi non obstes!, a Latin dictum from Diogenes of Sinope
Velim (Kolín District), a municipality and village in the Czech Republic
Velim railway test circuit